Hawk of the Hills is a 1927 American silent Western film serial directed by Spencer Gordon Bennet.

Cast
 Allene Ray as Mary
 Walter Miller as Laramie
 James Robert Chandler as Clyde Selby
 Jack Ganzhorn as Henry Selby
 Frank Lackteen as The Hawk
 Paul Panzer as Manson
 Wally Oettel as Shorty
 Harry Semels as Sheckard
 Jack Pratt as Colonel Jennings
 J. Parks Jones as Lieutenant MacCready
 Frederick Dana as Larry
 John T. Prince as The Hermit
 Whitehorse (as Chief Whitehorse)
 George Magrill
 Evangeline Russell as Indian Maiden
 Chief Yowlachie as Chief Long Hand

See also
 List of film serials
 List of film serials by studio

References

External links
 

1927 films
1927 Western (genre) films
American silent serial films
American black-and-white films
Films directed by Spencer Gordon Bennet
Silent American Western (genre) films
1920s American films